Suribong may refer to:

 Suribong (Jecheon/Chungju, Chungcheongbuk-do), a mountain in South Korea
 Suribong (Danyang, Chungcheongbuk-do), a mountain in South Korea